Getelo is a community in the district of Grafschaft Bentheim in Lower Saxony.

Geography

Location
Getelo lies west of Nordhorn on the border with the Netherlands. It belongs to the Joint Community (Samtgemeinde) of Uelsen, whose administrative seat is in the like-named community.

Constituent communities
The community’s two centres are Getelo and Getelomoor.

Politics

Mayor
The honorary mayor Jan-Hindrik Schipper was elected on 9 September 2001.

Culture and sightseeing

Buildings
Söven Pölle, barrows from the Bronze Age, are found in the community. The name gives the number as seven, although there were once as many as 26.

Economy and infrastructure

Transport
Various state highways and district roads join the community to Bundesstraße 403, about 10 km away.

References

External links
Joint community’s webpage

County of Bentheim (district)